Liao Hui may refer to:

Liao Hui (politician)
Liao Hui (weightlifter)